NuGet (pronounced "New Get") is a package manager designed to enable developers to share reusable code. It is a software as a service solution whose client app is free and open-source. The Outercurve Foundation initially created it under the name NuPack. Since its introduction in 2010, NuGet has evolved into a larger ecosystem of tools and services.

Overview
NuGet is a package manager for developers. It enables developers to share and consume useful code. A NuGet package is a single ZIP file that bears a .nupack or .nupkg filename extension and contains .NET assemblies and their needed files, with a manifest file describing its contents. Developers may create these packages with the NuGet client app and publish them in private or public repositories.

NuGet was initially distributed as a Visual Studio extension. Starting with Visual Studio 2012, both Visual Studio and Visual Studio for Mac can natively utilise NuGet packages. NuGet's client, nuget.exe is a free and open-source, command-line app that can both create and consume packages. MSBuild and .NET Core SDK (dotnet.exe) can use it when it is present. NuGet is also integrated with SharpDevelop.

It supports multiple programming languages, including:
 .NET Framework packages
.NET packages
 Native packages written in C++, with package creation aided by CoApp

See also 

 Binary repository manager
 Chocolatey
 ProGet
 Software repository
 Web Platform Installer
 WinOps

References

External links 
 
 
 Chocolatey
 

.NET software
2010 software
Free package management systems
Microsoft free software
Software using the Apache license